Goldie Gets Along is a 1933 American pre-Code comedy film directed by Malcolm St. Clair and starring Lili Damita, Charles Morton and Sam Hardy. The screenplay was written by William A. Drake, based on the 1931 novel of the same title by Hawthorne Hurst.

Synopsis
A young Frenchwoman living with her aunt and uncle in New Jersey has ambitions of making it in Hollywood and sand sets out to hitchhike her wake there. Her adventures involve her briefly being sent to jail for stealing a car and taking part in a series of crooked beauty contests. Eventually she makes it to Hollywood and tries to target a contract with a big film director, discovering in the process that the fiancée she left at home is now a big movie star.

Cast

Lili Damita as Goldie LaFarge
Charles Morton as Bill Tobin
Sam Hardy as Sam Muldoon
Nat Pendleton as Motorcycle Officer Cassidy
Lita Chevret as Marie Gardner
Arthur Hoyt as Mayor Silas C. Simms
 Henry Fink as Bob Flynn
Bradley Page as Frank Hawthorne
Lee Moran as Sam Kaplan
 Reginald Barlow as Uncle Saunders 
 Jane Keckley as Aunt Saunders 
 Harry Bowen as Fred 
 Gertrude Sutton as Esther
 Dell Henderson as 	Mr. Moon 
 Leonard Sillman as Amorous Motorist 
 June Brewster as Nurse
 Russ Powell as 	Saunders' Brother 
 Martha Mattox as Saunders' Sister-in-Law 
 Helen Parrish as Saunders' Child 
 Joan Standing as Mayor's Secretary 
Walter Brennan as Stuttering Waiter
 Bert Moorhouse as Receptionist

References

Bibliography
 Goble, Alan. The Complete Index to Literary Sources in Film. Walter de Gruyter, 1999.
 Tice, Karen W. Queens of Academe: Beauty Pageantry, Student Bodies, and College Life. Oxford University Press, 2012.

External links

1933 films
American black-and-white films
Films based on American novels
1933 romantic comedy films
Films directed by Malcolm St. Clair
American romantic comedy films
RKO Pictures films
1930s English-language films
1930s American films